The 2003 NCAA Division I men's lacrosse tournament was the 33rd annual Division I NCAA Men's Lacrosse Championship tournament. Sixteen NCAA Division I college men's lacrosse teams met after having played their way through a regular season, and for some, a conference tournament. The championship game was played at M&T Bank Stadium in Baltimore, Maryland in front of 37,944 fans, The University of Virginia won the championship title with a 9–7 win over top-ranked Johns Hopkins. The Cavaliers, led by A.J. Shannon, Chris Rotelli and Matt Ward, won their third NCAA championship.

UVA was able to hang on after an 8–5 lead to close out the 3rd quarter. Rotelli led all scorers with one goal and four assists in the finals for UVA, while Kyle Barrie led Hopkins with one goal and one assist. Virginia Goalie Tillman Johnson though was probably the unsung hero of the contest with 13 saves in the game for a .650 save percentage. He was named the Most Outstanding Player for this tournament. UVA closed out the season with a 15 and 2 record and Johnson closed out his career as Virginia's all-time leader in saves with 204.

Tournament results 

 * = Overtime

See also
2003 NCAA Division I Women's Lacrosse Championship
2003 NCAA Division II Men's Lacrosse Championship
2003 NCAA Division III Men's Lacrosse Championship

References

External links
Virginia Men's Lacrosse Wins National Championship
NCAA On Demand video of Title Game

NCAA Division I Men's Lacrosse Championship
NCAA Division I Men's Lacrosse Championship
NCAA Division I Men's Lacrosse Championship
NCAA Division I Men's Lacrosse Championship